A T-interface  or T reference point is used for basic rate access in an Integrated Services Digital Network (ISDN) environment.  It is a User–network interface reference point that is characterized by a four-wire, 144 kbit/s (2B+D) user rate.

Other characteristics of a T-interface are:
 it accommodates the link access and transport layer function in the ISDN architecture
 it is located at the user premises
 it is distance sensitive to the servicing Network termination 1
 it functions in a manner similar to that of the Channel service units (CSUs) and the Data service units (DSUs).

The T interface is electrically equivalent to the S interface, and the two are jointly referred to as the S/T interface.

See also
 R interface
 S interface
 U interface

References

Networking hardware
Integrated Services Digital Network